Triloculina is a genus of foraminifera in the order Miliolida, included in the Quinqueloculininae. The test is three, chambers each a half coil in length. Early chambers, at least in the microspheric generation, in quinqueloculinan arrangement, later becoming triloculine with successive chambers added in planes 120 degrees apart. Only the final three chambers are visible externally. The aperture is terminal, at the end of the final chamber, with a bifid tooth in adult forms.  As with the entire order, the test is composed of imperforate, porcelaneous calcite.

The Pliocene to Recent Cruciloculina is very similar, except for having a different aperture, and is a likely derivative.

References 

 Joseph A. Cushman,  1950  Foraminifera, their classification and economic use (4th ed)  Harvard University Press, Cambridge Mass.
 Alfred R. Loeblich Jr and HelenTappan, 1964. Sarcodina Chiefly "Thecamoebians" and Foraminiferida; Treatise on Invertebrate Paleontology, Part C Protista 2. Geological Society of America and University of Kansas Press.

Tubothalamea
Foraminifera genera
Fossil taxa described in 1826
Extant Jurassic first appearances